Ujjain Lok Sabha constituency is one of the 29 Lok Sabha constituencies in the Indian state of Madhya Pradesh. It covers the entire Ujjain district and part of Ratlam district. This constituency came into existence in 1951 as one of the 9th Lok Sabha constituencies in the erstwhile Madhya Bharat state. It has been reserved for candidates belonging to scheduled castes since 1966.

Vidhan Sabha segments
Presently, Ujjain Lok Sabha constituency comprises the following eight Vidhan Sabha (legislative assembly) segments:

Members of Lok Sabha

Election results

See also
 List of constituencies of the Lok Sabha

References

Lok Sabha constituencies in Madhya Pradesh
Ujjain district
Politics of Ujjain
1951 establishments in India
Constituencies established in 1951